The Scoliopteryginae are a subfamily of moths in the family Erebidae.  Larvae have distinctive, extra setae on the first through seventh abdominal segments.  Many adult moths in the subfamily have a proboscis adapted to pierce fruit skin, allowing consumption of the juice in the fruit.

Taxonomy
Phylogenetic studies have shown that this subfamily is a strongly supported, monophyletic group containing the tribes Anomini and Scoliopterygini, which had previously been included in the subfamily Calpinae of the family Noctuidae.

Tribes
Anomini
Scoliopterygini

References

 
Moth subfamilies